Zhongshan Island, formerly also known as Macau Island or Xiangshan Island, is a river island on the west bank of the Pearl River Delta in Guangdong, China. This area is separated from the mainland by a narrow waterway, and has a population of about 2.8 million. At the southern tip of the island is the peninsular part of the Macao Special Administrative Region. The rest of the island (and more than 70% of the population) is part of the cities of Zhongshan and Zhuhai.

China consider the island to have been linked to the continent and is no longer an island since the time of Ming Dynasty (14-17th century). There are also study which state the area was a group of islets and shoals by Ming Dynasty.

Notes

References 

Islands of Guangdong